Kinnaird ("high headland") is a village in Atholl, and the Perth and Kinross council area of Scotland. It lies on the Kinnaird Burn, one mile from Pitlochry on the A924 road.

References

Villages in Perth and Kinross